Belcher Bay is a bay at Kennedy Town on the northwest shore of Hong Kong Island in Hong Kong. It is located east of Sulphur Channel. The bay is named after Edward Belcher, a Nova Scotia-born British naval officer who surveyed the surrounding water and land in the Victoria Harbour in 1841. Green Island and Little Green Island are located within the bay.

It is currently used as a site for larger ships to load and unload goods between barges instead of mooring along docks.

See also
 Belcher's Street

Bays of Hong Kong
Kennedy Town
Victoria Harbour